Grönlund is a Finnish surname and may refer to:
 Ernst Grönlund (1902–1968), Finnish football and bandy player
 Timo Grönlund (born 1954), Finnish sprint canoer
 Tommi Grönlund (born 1969), Finnish football player
 Tommi Grönlund (artist) (born 1967), Finnish artist and label owner (Sähkö Recordings)